Goba Gorinchem is a Dutch basketball club based in Gorinchem. Established on 1 May 1970, the team played three seasons in the Eredivisie, the highest tier of Dutch basketball. GOBA entered the Eredivisie in 1993 and left in 1996. In the 1994–95 season, the team won the national NBB Cup.

In the 1995–96 season, Goba played two European games against Finnish club Namika Lahti.

Honours
NBB Cup
Winners (1): 1994–95
Haarlem Basketball Week
Runner-up (1): 1994
Promotiedivisie
Winners (1): 2008–09

European record

Notes

Notable players

 Richard van Poelgeest (2 seasons: '94-'96)
 Michael Huger (1 season: '94-'95)
 Tico Cooper	
 Jeff Malham
 Okke te Velde

References

External links
Official website

Basketball teams established in 1970
Former Dutch Basketball League teams
Basketball teams in the Netherlands
Sports clubs in Gorinchem